Rafael Medina Rodríguez (born 8 October 1979) is a Mexican former professional footballer.

External links
 
 
 
 eleconomista.com.mx
 espndeportes.espn.go.com

1979 births
Living people
Liga MX players
La Piedad footballers
C.D. Guadalajara footballers
Santos Laguna footballers
Tecos F.C. footballers
C.D. Veracruz footballers
Footballers from Guadalajara, Jalisco
Mexican footballers
Association football wingers
Association football fullbacks